Lomnice nad Popelkou is a town in Semily District in the Liberec Region of the Czech Republic. It has about 5,500 inhabitants. The town centre is well preserved and is protected by law as an urban monument zone, the local town part of Karlov is protected as a village monument reservation.

Administrative parts

Villages and hamlets of Černá, Chlum, Dráčov, Košov, Morcinov, Nové Dvory, Ploužnice, Rváčov, Skuhrov, Tikov and Želechy are administrative parts of Lomnice nad Popelkou.

Etymology
The name of the town is derived from the local stream, which used to be called Lomnice. The word Lomnice was then derived from lomný, which could mean "noisy" or "crooked".

Geography
It lies on the border between the Giant Mountains Foothills and Ještěd–Kozákov Ridge. The town lies on the Popelka stream.

History
The first written mention of Lomnice nad Popelkou is from 1308–1314 in Chronicle of Dalimil, where it is written about the origin of the town's coat of arms in 1242. Due to the harsh climatic conditions, Lomnice area was colonized at the turn of the 12th and 13th centuries. The first documented owner was Albrecht von Wallenstein in 1308.

Until 1918, the town was part of the Austrian monarchy (Austria side after the compromise of 1867), in the Semily – Semil District, one of the 94 Bezirkshauptmannschaften in Bohemia.

Demographics

Economy
The largest employer based in the town is Samohýl group a.s., engaged in the wholesale and distribution of veterinary drugs and products, and pet food and pet accessories.

Sport
The town has a notable ski club LSK Lomnice nad Popelkou, represented by ski jumpers such as Roman Koudelka or Čestmír Kožíšek. The club was founded in 1925.

Sights

The most valuable part of the town is Karlov, formed by Karlovské Square and its closest surroundings. It was founded in 1739–1740 by Karl Joseph Morzin and named by its founder. Karlov later urbanistically merged with the Lomnice nad Popelkou. Since 1995, it has been declared a village monument reservation. It is known for its preserved half-timbered houses, a typical example of local vernacular architecture.

The historic town centre is formed by Husovo Square. It main landmark is the town hall from 1864, after the previous town hall burned down. It has a neo-Gothic façade. Town Museum and Gallery was founded in 1891 and since 1945 is located in the Hrubý House, the only Neoclassical building in the town built in the 1820s.

Lomnice nad Popelkou Castle in the northern part of Husovo Square was created by rebuilding an old Gothic keep in 1566–1567 into the Renaissance castle, and then in 1730–1737 into its current Baroque form. Today it serves for cultural and social purposes and as the seat of the library.

Other sights on the square are two neo-Renaissance fountains from the second half of the 19th century, monument of Jan Hus from the 1890s, Baroque Marian column from 1713, and Baroque Church of Saint Nicholas from 1781.

Notable people
František Jiránek (1698–1778), composer, pupil of Antonio Vivaldi
František Doubravský (1790–1867), choirmaster, organist and composer
Karel Kodejška (born 1947), ski jumper
Vladimír Martinec (born 1949), ice hockey player

References

External links

Cities and towns in the Czech Republic
Populated places in Semily District